M.E.N.T. B.C., officially known as the Educational Union of Toumba Youth (Morfotiki Enosis Neoleas Toumbas) or M.E.N.T. B.C., is a Greek professional basketball club that was founded in 1926.  The team is located in Thessaloniki, Greece. M.E.N.T. B.C. currently competes in the third-tier level division of Greece, the Greek C League.

History 
Originally, the club's parent athletic association included the sports of basketball, football, cycling, and also a literary and entertainment section. Today, there are departments only for the basketball club and the volleyball club. In 2004, M.E.N.T. B.C. finished in 2nd place in the Greek 2nd Division, and thus earned a league promotion, and then competed in the top-tier level Greek Basket League, in the following 2004–05 season.

Roster

Notable players 

  Costas Christou
  Georgios Dedas
  Michalis Giannakidis
  Giannis Giannoulis
  Vangelis Karampoulas
  Sakis Karidas
  Vassilis Lipiridis
  Milan Sagias
  Dimitris Spanoulis
  Miljan Goljović
  Goran Kalamiza
  Dylan Page
  Marcus Taylor
  Clay Tucker

Head coaches
  Dimitrios Itoudis
  Stefanos Dedas
  Sotos Nikolaidis

External links 
 M.E.N.T. B.C. - Official Website 
 Eurobasket.com Team Page

Basketball teams established in 1926
Basketball teams in Greece